James Hamblin may refer to:
James Hamblin (cricketer) (born 1978), English cricketer
James Hamblin (journalist) (born 1983), American journalist and physician
James Hamblin (ice hockey), Canadian ice hockey player